Gonggong is a Chinese water god who is depicted in Chinese mythology and folktales as having a copper human head with an iron forehead, red hair, and the body of a serpent, or sometimes the head and torso are human, with the tail of a serpent. He is destructive and is blamed for various cosmic catastrophes. In all accounts, Gonggong ends up being killed or sent into exile, usually after losing a struggle with another major deity such as the fire god Zhurong.

In astronomy, the dwarf planet 225088 Gonggong is named after Gonggong.

Name
In English, the two syllables of the name are the same. But in Mandarin, they differ in tone ( Gònggōng), and in other Chinese languages they differ in their vowel and the initial consonant as well (cf. Middle Chinese , also Japanese kyōkō). The most common variant of the name, is identical to the first in English, but in Mandarin differs in tone (Gōnggōng), and in other Chinese languages in consonant and vowel as well (cf. Middle Chinese ). 

Gonggong's personal name is said to be Kanghui (pronounced either   in English, or as Mandarin Kānghuí  ).

Legend
Gonggong is known from the late Warring States period (before 221 BC). Gonggong appears in the ancient "Heavenly Questions" (Tianwen) poem of the Chu Ci, where he is blamed for knocking the earth's axis off center, causing it to tilt to the southeast and the sky to tilt to the northwest. This axial tilt is used to explain why the rivers of China generally flow to the southeast, especially the Yangzi River and the Yellow River, and why the sun, moon, and stars move towards the northwest. Literature from the Han dynasty becomes much more detailed regarding Gonggong.

Gonggong was credited in various mythological contexts as being responsible for great floods, often in concert with his minister Xiangliu (a.k.a. Xiangyao), who has nine heads and the body of a snake.

Gonggong was ashamed that he lost the fight with Zhurong, the Chinese god of fire, to claim the throne of Heaven. In a fit of rage, he smashed his head against Buzhou Mountain, one of eight pillars holding up the sky, greatly damaging it and causing the sky to tilt towards the northwest and the earth to shift to the southeast, which caused great floods and suffering. In one account of the myth, Gonggong kills himself in the process and fire comes out of the shattered mountain alongside floods.

The goddess Nüwa cut off the legs of the giant turtle Ao and used them in place of the fallen pillar, ending the floods and suffering; she was, however, unable to fully correct the tilted sky and earth and alter their effects on the sun, moon, stars, and rivers in China.

See also
Yinglong
Four Evildoers

References

Citations

Bibliography

External links
 Book cover with (copyrighted) image of Gonggong
 second image
 Gong Gong  at ChinaKnowledge.de: An Encyclopaedia on Chinese History, Literature and Art

Three Sovereigns and Five Emperors
Chinese gods
Water gods
Destroyer gods
Evil deities
Four Evildoers
Deities in Chinese folk religion
225088 Gonggong
Chinese legendary creatures